Paolo Emilio Rondinini (1617 – 16 September 1668) was an Italian Catholic Cardinal.

Early life and education
Rondinini was born in 1617 to Alessandro Rondinini and Felice Zacchia. He was the grandson of Cardinal Laudivio Zacchia (who had been married and had two children including Felice Zacchia before accepting an ecclesiastic career) and was the grand-nephew (also on his mother's side) of Cardinal Paolo Emilio Zacchia.

He studied at the University of Perugia and then became a clerk of the Apostolic Chamber in 1637 at age 20.

During the First War of Castro he endeared himself to the Barberini and their uncle Pope Urban VIII by raising his own company of cuirassiers to fight on the side of papal forces.

Cardinalate
Despite the plot by members of the Spanish faction of the College of Cardinals to unseat Pope Urban in favour of his grandfather, the Pope nonetheless made Rondinini cardinal deacon of the deaconry of S. Maria in Aquiro in the consistory of 13 July 1643. He participated in the papal conclave of 1644.

Episcopate
He was elected Bishop of Assisi on 5 May 1653. He participated in the papal conclave of 1655. In the same year he opted for the deaconry of San Giorgio in Velabro, and in 1656 for that of Santa Maria in Cosmedin. Cardinal Rondinini participated in the Papal conclave of 1667. On 30 April 1668 he was promoted to the order of cardinal priests with the title of Sant'Eusebio.

He died on 16 September 1668 and was buried in the church of Santa Maria sopra Minerva (as was his grandfather) in Rome.

References and notes

1617 births
1668 deaths
17th-century Italian Roman Catholic bishops
University of Perugia alumni
Bishops in Umbria
17th-century Italian cardinals
Cardinals created by Pope Urban VIII
Clergy from Rome
Apostolic Camera